The Sakapultek are a Maya people in Guatemala, located in the municipality of Sacapulas. The Sakapultek language is closely related to Kʼicheʼ.

Notes

References
 
 
 

Indigenous peoples in Guatemala
Maya peoples of Guatemala
Mesoamerican cultures